is a Japanese manga series published by K Contents. It has been serialized online via YouTube with voiced narration and dialogue since March 2019. An anime television series adaptation by DLE aired from October to December 2022.

Characters

Professor

Media

Anime
An anime television series adaptation by DLE was announced on May 1, 2022. The series is directed by Tsukasa Nishiyama and written by Naotoshi Nakajima, with Nishiyama as character designer, Masakatsu Omuro as sound director, and Kosuke Yamashita as music composer. It aired from October 5 to December 21, 2022, on Tokyo MX and other channels. The opening theme song "Catastrophe" is performed by Nano, while the ending theme song "Bad City (Bug Human)" is performed by Lowland Jazz. Crunchyroll licensed the series. Medialink licensed the series in Asia-Pacific.

References

External links
 
 

Anime series based on manga
Crunchyroll anime
Japanese webcomics
Medialink
Tokyo MX original programming
YouTube channels